Dança dos Famosos 6, also taglined as Dança dos Famosos 2009 is the sixth season of the Brazilian reality television show Dança dos Famosos which premiered April 19, 2009, with and the competitive live shows beginning on the following week on April 26, 2009 on the Rede Globo television network.

Ten celebrities were paired with ten professional ballroom dancers. The celebrities did not know their professional partners until they were introduced to each other at the launch show. Fausto Silva and Adriana Colin were the hosts for this season. This was Adriana Colin's last season as co-hostess.

Actress Paolla Oliveira won the competition over Zorra Total comedian Leandro Hassum and Malhação cast member Jonatas Faro.

Overview

 The season follows the same split-by-gender style from the last couple of seasons. However, with new rules for that round. The five judges voted on a couple to be eliminated. The couple with the most votes would be sent home.
 On the wild card round, the first four couples eliminated returned danced. The couple with the highest number of public votes would be brought back into the competition. The winners were Katiuscia & Mauro with 61% of the vote.
 The final round began on week 8, where the final seven couples danced together at the same night. For the first time, the finals  featured a final three rather than a final two.

Couples

Elimination chart

Key
 
 
  Eliminated
  Bottom two
  Dance-off
  Third place
  Runner-up
  Winner

Weekly results

Week 1 
Presentation of the Celebrities
Aired: April 19, 2009

Week 2 
Week 1 – Women
Style: Disco
Aired: April 26, 2009

Week 3 
Week 1 – Men
Style: Disco
Aired: May 3, 2009

Week 4 
Week 2 – Women
Style: Forró
Aired: May 10, 2009

Week 5 
Week 2 – Men
Style: Forró
Aired: May 17, 2009

Week 6 
Repechage
Style: Rock and Roll
Aired: May 24, 2009

Week 7 
Top 7
Style: Country
Aired: May 31, 2009

Week 8 
Top 6
Style: Salsa
Aired: June 7, 2009

Week 9 
Top 5
Style: Indian Dance
Aired: June 14, 2009

Week 10 
Top 4
Style: Waltz
Aired: June 21, 2009

Week 11 
Top 3
Style: Samba & Tango
Aired: June 28, 2009

References

External links
 Official Site 

Season 06
2009 Brazilian television seasons

pt:Dança dos Famosos 6